The Canton of Saint-Estève is a former canton of the Pyrénées-Orientales department in Languedoc-Roussillon, France. It had 18,677 inhabitants (2012).

The canton comprised the following communes:
Baho
Baixas
Calce
Saint-Estève
Villeneuve-la-Rivière

References

Saint-Esteve